Koryciski  (Korytyska) is a village in the administrative district of Gmina Dubicze Cerkiewne. It is within Hajnówka County, Podlaskie Voivodeship, in north-eastern Poland, close to the border with Belarus.

The village has a population of 150.

References

Koryciski